"Take Me to the Next Phase (Part 1)" was a hit song for R&B/funk band The Isley Brothers. The song has the sound of a live stadium recording, but it was created entirely in a recording studio. Ernie and Marvin Isley plus Chris Jasper laid the foot stomps and some of the crowd noises across 24 recording tracks. Released from their platinum selling 1978 album, Showdown (Isley Brothers album), the single spent 2 weeks at number one on the R&B singles chart.  However, it never managed to cross over to the Billboard Hot 100 singles chart.

References

1978 singles
The Isley Brothers songs
1978 songs
Songs written by Rudolph Isley
Songs written by O'Kelly Isley Jr.
Songs written by Ronald Isley
Songs written by Ernie Isley
Songs written by Marvin Isley
Songs written by Chris Jasper
T-Neck Records singles